The Swedish National Socialist Unity Party was a National Socialist political party in Sweden. The party was born out of a split in the Swedish National Socialist Party in October 1933, as the Göteborg-based Party Staff (partistaben) of SNSP declared the party leader Birger Furugård expelled from the party. Furugård was however able to isolate the Party Staff faction, and retained a majority of the party membership. The Party Staff regrouped as the Swedish National Socialist Unity Party (commonly nicknamed SNSP-staben). The Party Staff group continued to publish Vår Kamp as its party organ.

In December 1933 the Skanör-Falsterbo branch of the party broke away and formed a party of its own.

In late 1933 the Swedish National Socialist Unity Party merged into the National Socialist Bloc.

References

Political parties established in 1933
Political parties disestablished in 1933
Defunct political parties in Sweden
Nazi parties
Nationalist parties in Sweden